Karada  may refer to:
 Karada, India, a settlement in Kodagu district, Karnataka
 Bondage rope harness, a rope bondage technique
 Cleistanthus collinus, a toxic tree whose bark contains leucodelphinidin
 Karhade Brahmin, a Hindu tribe in India

See also
 Karrada, a suburb of Baghdad
 2016 Karrada bombing